Masudiyeh (also Romanized as Masʿūdīyeh) is a village in Saidabad Rural District, in the Central District of Savojbolagh County, Alborz Province, Iran. At the 2006 census, its population was 46, in 10 families.

References 

Populated places in Savojbolagh County